Thierry Boon is a Belgian scientist, former Director of the Ludwig Cancer Research branch in (Belgium) and professor at the Université Catholique de Louvain. He observed that tumour cells that have acquired new mutations as a result of mutagen treatment in vitro, often become incapable of forming tumours because they express new antigens recognized by the T cells of the immune system. His research allowed him to isolate the genes that code for these so-called tumour antigens. He is a member of the Cancer Research Institute Scientific Advisory Council, The National Academy of Sciences, and The Academy of Cancer Immunology.

Awards
 1986: Rik & Nel Wouters Prize
 1986: De Vooght Prize in Immunology
 1987: Cancer Research Institute William B. Coley Award
 1990: Dr. Josef Steiner Cancer Research Prize
 1990: Francqui Prize on Biological and Medical Sciences
 1994: Louis-Jeantet Prize for Medicine
 1994: Rabbi Shai Shacknai Memorial Prize in Immunology & Cancer Research
 1995: Sandoz Prize in Immunology
 1999: Leopold Griffuel Prize

References

External links
 Ludwig Cancer Research
 Group of Thierry Boon @ LICR Brussels
 Admission to NAS
 Stepping down as Branch Director of LICR Brussels
 Francqui Foundation
 Louis Jeantet Prize
 Académie royale de Belgique
 Interview with Thierry Boon - Sciencewatch
 Lexpress.fr

Living people
Academic staff of the Université catholique de Louvain
Belgian immunologists
Foreign associates of the National Academy of Sciences
Year of birth missing (living people)